The 2019 Tour of Belgium, known as the 2019 Baloise Belgium Tour for sponsorship purposes, was the 89th edition of the Tour of Belgium cycling stage race. It took place from 12 to 16 June 2019 in Belgium, as part of the 2019 UCI Europe Tour; it was categorised as a 2.HC race.

Teams
22 teams were selected to take part in Tour of Belgium. Four of these were UCI WorldTeams, with twelve UCI Professional Continental teams, five UCI Continental teams and a team representing the Belgium national team.

Route

Stages

Stage 1
12 June 2019 — Sint-Niklaas to Knokke-Heist,

Stage 2
13 June 2019 — Knokke-Heist to Zottegem,

Stage 3
14 June 2019 — Grimbergen to Grimbergen, individual time trial (ITT)

Stage 4
15 June 2019 — Seraing to Seraing,

Stage 5
16 June 2019 — Tongeren to Beringen,

Classification leadership table
In the 2019 Tour of Belgium, three different jerseys will be awarded. The general classification is calculated by adding each cyclist's finishing times on each stage. Time bonuses are awarded to the first three finishers on all stages: the stage winner wins a ten-second bonus, with six and four seconds for the second and third riders respectively. Bonus seconds will also be awarded to the first three riders at sprints in the "golden kilometre", where three intermediate sprint positions are to be held within the space of a kilometre. Three seconds are awarded for the winner of the sprint, two seconds for the rider in second and one second for the rider in third. The leader of the general classification receives a blue jersey. This classification is considered the most important of the 2019 Tour of Belgium, and the winner of the classification is considered the winner of the race.

The second classification was the points classification. Riders were awarded points for finishing in the top ten in a stage. Unlike in the points classification in the Tour de France, the winners of all stages were awarded the same number of points.  The leader of the points classification was awarded a red jersey.
There was also a combativity classification, where riders received points for finishing in the top five at intermediate sprint points during each stage, on a 10–8–6–4–2 scale. Bonus points were awarded if a breakaway had gained a sufficient advantage over the field, up to a maximum of 5 points. There was also a classification for teams, in which the times of the best three cyclists in a team on each stage were added together; the leading team at the end of the race was the team with the lowest cumulative time.

References

External links

2019
2019 in Belgian sport
2019 UCI Europe Tour
June 2019 sports events in Belgium